Nikulskoye is a rural locality (a selo) in Nebylovskoye Rural Settlement, Yuryev-Polsky District, Vladimir Oblast, Russia. The population was 33 as of 2010.

Geography 
Nikulskoye is located on the Vykros River, 15 km southeast from Yuryev-Polsky (the district's administrative centre) by road. Voskresenskoye is the nearest rural locality.

References 

Rural localities in Yuryev-Polsky District